Shaw Clifton (born 21 September 1945) is a former General of The Salvation Army. He succeeded John Larsson as the 18th General on 2 April 2006.

Career
Shaw Clifton was born on 21 September 1945 in Belfast, Northern Ireland.

Clifton was commissioned as an officer of The Salvation Army on 5 July 1973. His first appointment was to Burnt Oak Corps (London), in the British Territory in July 1973. He went briefly to continue his theological studies at International Headquarters (IHQ) in October 1973, before being appointed in January 1975 with his wife, Helen, to Zimbabwe (then Rhodesia), initially to the Mazowe Secondary School and then to Bulawayo as corps officers.

He returned to the United Kingdom in 1979 to take charge of Enfield Corps, North London. In June 1982 he became the legal and parliamentary secretary at International Headquarters (IHQ). This was followed by an appointment in 1989 to Bromley Corps in South London. In May 1992 he became Divisional Commander in the Durham and Tees Division of the United Kingdom Territory with the Republic of Ireland. He served in that post until 1995. He was promoted to the rank of Lieutenant-Colonel and appointed Divisional Commander in the Massachusetts Division of the USA Eastern Territory for two years. He was appointed as Territorial Commander of the Pakistan Territory of The Salvation Army in 1997 with the rank of Colonel, later promoted to the rank of Commissioner while still in Pakistan where the work of the Army prospered during his service there. In 2002, he became Territorial Commander of the New Zealand, Fiji and Tonga Territory.

In 2004, he was returned to the United Kingdom territory this time as Territorial Commander until, at the Army's 16th High Council held at Sunbury Court, Sunbury-on-Thames, London, he became General-elect of The Salvation Army on 28 January 2006, taking office in succession to General John Larsson on 2 April 2006. He served a five-year term, entering retirement in 2011.

He married Commissioner Helen Clifton (née Ashman), who was born in 1948 in Edmonton, London, on 15 July 1967. They have three children.

Commissioner Helen Clifton was world president of women's ministries and was a Salvation Army officer from 1973. In 1984 they jointly edited a book, Growing Together, about marriage and family life.

On 13 September 2007, Clifton became a Freeman of the City of London.

Clifton and his wife retired in April 2011. Helen Clifton died in June 2011. In 2013 Clifton married Birgitte Brekke, an officer of The Salvation Army.

Education
 LLB, King's College London
 Bachelor of Divinity, King's College, London
 AKC (Associate of King's College, London)
 PhD (History of Religion) at King's College London

Views and politics

During his years in office, Clifton was interested in the connection between Christianity and social-ethical issues. He helped to shape current Salvationist positional statements on issues such as abortion, war, race and ethnicity, gender, marriage and family life, euthanasia, human sexuality and pornography.

Clifton advocated a role for churches in social action, not just in social service. Such a role should be a non-party role and it is not for the churches to tell believers or members how to cast their vote.

As world leader of The Salvation Army Clifton worked for greater opposition to human trafficking. His convictions on the Army's calling to work for social justice gave rise to the establishing of the international social justice commission based in New York near the United Nations.

He encouraged freedom of contact between the Army and other branches of the Body of Christ, including the Roman Catholic Church.

Clifton sought to promote talented women Army leaders into more senior roles.

He emphasized the use of modern communication techniques in Christian ministry and encouraged a book publishing programme by The Salvation Army's International Headquarters in London and around the world.

He is known for writing and speaking on the practical possibility of living a pure and holy life in the secular world, by divine indwelling and grace. He draws upon the writings of the Reformers, John Wesley, William Booth, Catherine Booth, Samuel Logan Brengle, and Edward Read.

Bibliography
 What does the Salvationist say ...? (about divorce, abortion, race relations, euthanasia, war) (Salvationist Publisher & Supplies 1977) 
 Growing Together by Shaw Clifton and Helen Clifton (International Headquarters of the Salvation Army, London; 1 Dec 1984) 
 Strong Doctrine, Strong Mercy (International Headquarters of the Salvation Army, London 1985) 
 Never the same again: Encouragement for new and not-so-new Christians (Crest Books 1997) 
 New Love Thinking Aloud About Practical Holiness (Flag Publications 2004) 
 Who Are These Salvationists?: An Analysis for the 21st Century (Crest Books 2004) 
 Selected Writings Vol 1 1974-1999 (Salvation Books, London) [2010] 
 Selected Writings Vol 2 2000-2010 (Salvation Books, London) [2010] 
 'From Her Heart - Selections from the Preaching and Teaching of Helen Clifton' ed. Shaw Clifton (Crest Books, Alexandria, USA) [2012]  
 'Something Better - Autobiographical Essays' (Salvation Books, London) [2014]
 'Crown of Glory, Crown of Thorns - The Salvation Army in Wartime' (Salvation Books, London) [2015]

 

The History of The Salvation Army, Volume Nine, 1995-2015 (Salvation Books, London) [2018]

References

1945 births
Living people
People educated at The Latymer School
Alumni of King's College London
Associates of King's College London
People from Belfast
Salvationists from Northern Ireland
Salvation Army officers